As I Lay Dying is a 1930 novel by William Faulkner.

As I Lay Dying may also refer to:

 As I Lay Dying (band), an American metalcore band
 As I Lay Dying (film), a 2013 film adaptation of the novel
 "As I Lay Dying" (The Vampire Diaries), an episode of the television series The Vampire Diaries

See also
 As I Lay Dying/American Tragedy, a 2002 split album from As I Lay Dying and American Tragedy

pt:As I Lay Dying